Phyllonorycter albanotella is a moth of the family Gracillariidae. It is known from Ontario and Québec in Canada and Illinois, Kentucky, Ohio, Texas, Maine, Vermont and Connecticut in the United States.

The wingspan is 6–7.5 mm.

The larvae feed on Quercus species, including Quercus alba, Quercus bicolor, Quercus macrocarpa, Quercus nigra and Quercus obtusiloba. They mine the leaves of their host plant. The mine has the form of a rather small tentiform mine on the underside of the leaf. It is located either at the edge of the leaf or between two veins, the loosened epidermis being thrown into numerous longitudinal wrinkles. The pupa is enclosed in a rather large semi-transparent oval silken cocoon.

References

External links
mothphotographersgroup
Phyllonorycter at microleps.org

albanotella
Moths of North America
Taxa named by Vactor Tousey Chambers
Moths described in 1875
Leaf miners
Lepidoptera of Canada
Lepidoptera of the United States